Cercopemyces is a mushroom genus allied to Ripartitella and not clearly aligned with well characterized mushroom families. The genus contains three species, one known from western and another, previously known as Ripartitella ponderosa or Cystoderma ponderosa, from eastern North America, and a third from Europe.

Ceropemyces grow in arid regions and resemble saprophytic Amanita that are sometimes classified as Saproamanita and that also grow in arid regions. The type species grows near mountain mahogany.

Etymology

The name Ceropemyces was derived from the Ancient Greek name for mischievous forest creatures, the Cercopes, and - (fungus).

Species

 Cercopemyces crocodilinus
 Cercopemyces ponderosus
 Cercopemyces rickenii

See also
List of Agaricales genera

References

Agaricales enigmatic taxa
Agaricales genera